William Boynton Butler VC (20 November 1894 – 25 March 1972) was an English recipient of the Victoria Cross, the highest and most prestigious award for gallantry in the face of the enemy that can be awarded to British and Commonwealth forces.

Butler was 22 years old, and a private in the 17th Battalion, The West Yorkshire Regiment (The Prince of Wales's Own), British Army, attached to 106th TM. Battery during the First World War when the following deed took place on 6 August 1917 east of Lempire, France for which he was awarded the VC.

The Stokes gun was a 3-inch trench mortar invented by Sir Wilfred Stokes.

References

External links
Location of grave and VC medal (West Yorkshire)

1894 births
1972 deaths
People from Armley
British World War I recipients of the Victoria Cross
West Yorkshire Regiment soldiers
British Army personnel of World War I
Recipients of the Croix de Guerre 1914–1918 (France)
British Home Guard soldiers
British Army recipients of the Victoria Cross
Military personnel from Leeds